Nomanbhai Mahmedbhai Miabhoy (born 6 September 1907) was an Indian judge and Chief Justice of the Gujarat High Court.

Career
Miabhoy passed Law from Sir L. A. Shah Law College and started practice in Ahmedabad in 1929. He also worked as the Honorary Professor in Sir L.A. Shah Law College. He was appointed an Assistant Judge in 1941 and became District Judge of Baroda, Surat and Broach district. In 1957, Miabhoy became an additional judge of the Bombay High Court. In 1960 he was appointed a Judge of Gujarat High Court. Justice Miabhoy was elevated as the Chief Justice of Gujarat High Court on 21 April 1966 and retired on 5 September 1967 from the post.

References

1907 births
Year of death missing
20th-century Indian judges
20th-century Indian lawyers
Chief Justices of the Gujarat High Court
Judges of the Bombay High Court